HMS Express was the name-ship of a class of two schooner-rigged advice-boats of the Royal Navy. Express was launched in 1800 and served until she was sold in 1813. During her career she served in one action and one campaign that in 1847 qualified her surviving crew members for clasps to the Naval General Service Medal.

Career
In January 1801 Lieutenant Robert Sayer commissioned Express for Jersey. Then in August 1802 he sailed her for Trinidad. She spent several years there as a tender with no fixed commanding officer.

In July 1805 Express was in the Leeward Islands under the command of Lieutenant William Swiney. His replacement was Lieutenant George Spearing.

Together, they supported General Francisco de Miranda, aboard his ship Leander, in his quixotic and unsuccessful attempt to liberate the Captaincy General of Venezuela from Spain rule.

In September 1806, Lieutenant Humphrey Fleming Senhouse was appointed to command Express. The encounter was inconclusive as the French broke off the action and sailed away. Express had three men wounded. She had exhausted all her 18-pounder shot. The governor of Martinique, Admiral Villaret Joyeuse, reportedly cashiered Arguss captain for his failure to capture Express. 

Admiral Sir Alexander Cochrane assigned Senhouse to patrol the Spanish Main to the west of Caracas, with the assistance of the schooner . The British captured and burnt numerous armed launches and captured many prisoners. Senhouse paroled his prisoners as he was too far from friendly ports to bring them in.

In March 1808, Senhouse joined . His replacement as commander of Express was Lieutenant William Dowers.

On 27 February 1807 the sloop  and Express captured the brig Altrevido, Nichola Valpardo, Master.  shared by agreement in the prize money due Express.

On 2 March 1807 Express and Ballahoo captured the sloop Endeavour. three weeks later, on 20 March, Express and Ballahoo captured the sloop Two Friends, Antonio, master.

They arrived on 30 March and sent in a landing party of seamen and marines from the vessels of the squadron, all under the overall command of Captain Sherriff of Lily. As the boats approached they exchanged fire with a battery of 9-pounder guns covering the entrance to the harbour. The ships' guns silenced the battery and the French surrendered.

The vessels joined together to attack the French 16-gun brig Cygne and two schooners off Saint-Pierre, Martinique. Circe sent in her boats, which the French repelled, causing her 56 casualties, dead, wounded and missing.

That evening , under the command of Captain Edward Pelham Brenton, joined Circe and Stork. The next day fire from Amaranthe compelled the crew of Cygne to abandon her and Amaranthes boats boarded and destroyed the French vessel.

Amaranthe's boats, assisted by boats from Express, boarded the second schooner and set fire to her too. Express lost one man killed and three wounded.

Including the losses in the earlier fighting before Amaranthe arrived, the British had lost some 12 men killed, 31 wounded, and 26 missing (drowned or prisoners) for little gain. Brenton was promoted to Post-captain soon after the battle, with the promotion being back dated to 13 December, the date of the battle. In 1847 the Admiralty authorised the award of the NGSM with the clasp "Off the Pearl Rock 13 Decr. 1808" to all the surviving claimants from the action.

Lieutenant William Malone replaced Dowers. Then in February 1809 Express was in the squadron that took part in the successful invasion of Martinique. In 1847 the Admiralty authorised the NGSM with clasp "Martinique" to all surviving claimants from the campaign.

Fate
Express was laid up in ordinary at Portsmouth in 1812. On 28 April 1813, the Commissioners of the Navy offered the "Express brig, 179 tons" for sale at Portsmouth. She was sold to Messrs. Walters, of Rotherhithe, in May 1813.

Citations

References
 

 

Express-class schooners
1800 ships
Brigs of the Royal Navy
Ships built in Rotherhithe